The Dream of Butterfly (Italian:  Il sogno di Butterfly, German: Premiere der Butterfly) is a 1939 musical drama film directed by Carmine Gallone and starring Maria Cebotari, Fosco Giachetti and Germana Paolieri. It is an variation of the plot of the opera Madame Butterfly. A co-production between Italy and Germany, two separate versions were produced in the respective languages. It is also alternatively titled Madame Butterfly. It was one of several opera-related films directed by Gallone following on from Casta Diva (1935) and Giuseppe Verdi (1938).

It was shot at the Cinecittà Studios in Rome. The film's sets were designed by the art directors Ivo Battelli and Guido Fiorini. It was shown at the 1939 Venice Film Festival.

Synopsis
In nineteenth-century Italy, promising singer Rosi Belloni meets American music student Harry Peters and the two become engaged and she falls pregnant by him. Before she can tell him this news he informs her he is returning to the United States for three years for further musical education. Unwilling to stand in the way of his future, she does not tell him about her pregnancy. Although he promises to be in contact within a year, she receives no word from him.

Five years later Peters, now a conductor at the Metropolitan Opera in New York City, returns to Italy with his new American wife. In the meantime Rosi Belloni has risen to become a leading opera singer, and is chosen by Puccini to sing the title role in his new opera Madame Butterfly at La Scala. Encountering the five-year old son who has been raised to honour the idea of his father, Peters comes to realise what he missed by not marrying Belloni. In turn she comes to appreciate how much her own life resembles that of Madame Butterfly.

Cast

Italian version
 Maria Cebotari as Rosi Belloni/Madame Butterfly
 Fosco Giachetti as Harry Peters
 Lucie Englisch as Anna Ranieri
 Germana Paolieri as Mary Peterson
 Luigi Almirante as Riccardo Belli
 Angelo Ferrari as Ispiziente
 Renato Cialente	
 Guglielmo Barnabò 
 Carlo Lombardi	
 Miranda Bonansea 	
 Giuseppe Pierozzi		
 Paolo Stoppa		
 Rio Nobile	
 Gino Viotti	
 Elena Ambrosetti	
 Carlo Bonansea	
 Liana Del Balzo		
 Gabriella Duda		
 Mary Dumont
 Achille Majeroni	
 Guido Notari		
 Giovanni Stupin 	
 Saro Urzì

German version
 Maria Cebotari as Sängerin Rosi Belloni
 Fosco Giachetti as Kapellmeister Harry Peterson
 Lucie Englisch as Anni Eigner, Rosis Freundin
 Paul Kemp as Richard Hell, Maler und Annis Bräutigam
 Joachim Pfaff as Harry, Rosis Sohn
 Luise Stranzinger as Mary Peterson, Harrys Frau
 Siegfried Schürenberg as Paul Fieri, Richards Freund
 Alfred Neugebauer as Camillo Chiosone, Puccinis Beauftragter
 Heinrich Fuchs as Luigi Volegno, Theaterangestellter
 Angelo Ferrari as Der Inspizient der Mailänder Scala
 Walter Schramm-Duncker as Gast beim Silvester-Ball
 Herbert Weißbach as Gast beim Silvester-Ball
 Roma Bahn as Gast beim Silvester-Ball
 Else Ehser as Eine Verehrerin von Harrys Klavierspiel
 Willi Schur as Der "Weltuntergangsverkünder"
 Klaus Pohl as Der schwerhörige Mann beim "Weltuntergang"
 Egon Brosig as Der Ober im Restaurant
 Hans Junkermann as Der Theaterdiener
 Gertrud de Lalsky as Rosis Garderobenfrau
 Paul Schneider-Duncker as Der Direktor beim Empfang nach der Premiere
 Max Wilmsen as Der Hotelportier in Neapel
 Bobby Todd as Der Inspizient in der Oper von Bologna

References

Bibliography 
 Bagnoli, Giorgio. The La Scala Encyclopedia of the Opera. Simon and Schuster, 1993.
 Waldman, Harry. Nazi Films in America, 1933–1942. McFarland, 2008.
 Barron, Emma. Popular High Culture in Italian Media, 1950–1970: Mona Lisa Covergirl. Springer, 2018.

External links 
 

1939 films
Italian drama films
German drama films
1939 drama films
1930s Italian-language films
Films directed by Carmine Gallone
Italian black-and-white films
Films shot at Cinecittà Studios
1930s Italian films
1930s German films